The 2009 Men's Hockey Champions Challenge was held from December 6 to December 13, 2009 in Salta, Argentina. New Zealand defeated Pakistan to take the title, and promoted to the Champions Trophy tournament in 2010.

Results
All times are Argentina Time (UTC−04:00)

Pools

Pool A

Pool B

Fifth to eighth place classification

Crossover

Seventh and eighth place

Fifth and sixth place

First to fourth place classification

Semifinals

Third and fourth place

Final

Awards

Statistics

Final ranking

External links
Official FIH website
Official website

Men's Hockey Champions Challenge I
Champions Challenge I
International field hockey competitions hosted by Argentina